The 1961 International 100 was a motor race staged at the Warwick Farm Raceway in New South Wales, Australia on 29 January 1961.
Contested as a Formula Libre race, it was staged over a distance of 101.25 miles (163 km) and was the first annual International 100 race to be held at Warwick Farm. 

The race was won by Stirling Moss, driving a Lotus 18 Coventry Climax FPF.

Race results

Notes
 Pole Position: Stirling Moss (Lotus 18 Coventry Climax FPF), 1:39.3
 Weather: Hot (41 degrees C)
 Race distance: 45 laps (101.25 miles, 163 km)
 Entries: 17
 Starters: 14
 Finishers: 5
 Winner's race time: 1 hr 16 min 33.9 sec
 Fastest lap: Stirling Moss (Lotus 18 Coventry Climax FPF) : 1:40.3

References

International
Motorsport at Warwick Farm